Norlie may refer to:

Norlie, part of Swedish hip hop duo Norlie & KKV
John Norlie, English musician 
Olaf M. Norlie, a Lutheran minister, educator and scholar